The 1967 Delaware Fightin' Blue Hens football team was an American football team that represented the University of Delaware in the Middle Atlantic Conference during the 1967 NCAA College Division football season. In its second season under head coach Tubby Raymond, the team compiled a 2–7 record (2–3 against MAC opponents), finished in fourth place in the MAC University Division, and was outscored by a total of 222 to 178. Art Smith was the team captain. The team played its home games at Delaware Stadium in Newark, Delaware.

Schedule

References

Delaware
Delaware Fightin' Blue Hens football seasons
Delaware Fightin' Blue Hens football